Radek Divecký (born 21 March 1974) is a retired Czech football forward. He played in the Gambrinus liga for ten seasons, eight of those for FK Teplice, making nearly 200 league appearances and scoring over 40 goals.

References

External links 

1974 births
Living people
Czech footballers
Czech First League players
FK Teplice players
FC Slovan Liberec players
Jeonnam Dragons players
1. FK Příbram players
K League 1 players
Expatriate footballers in Poland
Association football forwards
People from Teplice
Sportspeople from the Ústí nad Labem Region